The Shpilman International Prize for Excellence in Photography is an international bi-yearly photography prize awarded by Israel Museum in Jerusalem.

History 
The Shpilman International Prize for Excellence in Photography was created by Shalom Shpilman in 2010 and was awarded once a year. After the Shpilman Institute of Photography was closed in 2013, the Shpilman family endowed the Israel Museum in Jerusalem to award the prize every two years. The goal of the prize is to award individuals who work in photography. The prize money is 45000 USD. The decision is made based on review by an international jury of five jurors, appointed by Israel Museum. Candidates are nominated by art professionals, working with Israel Museum.

Winners

References

External links 

Photography awards
Awards established in 2010
Israeli awards